Saopaulista is a genus of moths belonging to the family Tortricidae.

Species
Saopaulista prima Razowski & Becker, 2000

See also
List of Tortricidae genera

References

 , 2000: Description of six Brazilian genera of Euliini and their species (Lepidoptera: Tortricidae). SHILAP Revista de Lepidopterología 28: 385–393.

External links
Tortricid.net

Euliini
Tortricidae genera